The word "Revol" is used in the following contexts:
Revol (song), a 1994 single by the Manic Street Preachers
Revol Wireless, an Ohio-based wireless provider
Revol Porcelaine, a French porcelain manufacturer
Revol (surname), people with Revol as their surname